Prendergast Vale School is a mixed all-through school located in the Lewisham area of the London Borough of Lewisham, England.

The school was first established as Lewisham Bridge Primary School. The school was renamed Prendergast Vale School in September 2011 as par when it began to accept secondary school age pupils. The former primary school has been refurbished and developed to accommodate a full all-through school.

Prendergast Vale School is a foundation school and is part of the Worshipful Company of Leathersellers federation of schools, which also includes Prendergast School and Prendergast Ladywell School.

Notable former pupils

Lewisham Bridge School

Lewisham Bridge School was founded in 1793 and shut down in 2011 to become an all through school now named Prendergast Vale School.
Angie Le Mar, comedian & actor

References

External links
Prendergast Vale College official website

Primary schools in the London Borough of Lewisham
Secondary schools in the London Borough of Lewisham
Foundation schools in the London Borough of Lewisham